Alessio Nepi (born 25 January 2000) is an Italian professional footballer who plays as a forward for  club Renate on loan from Pro Vercelli.

Club career
Formed in Ascoli youth system, Nepi joined Fermana in 2018. He made his professional debut in Serie C on 7 October 2018 against Ravenna.

On 10 August 2020, he extended his contract with the club.

On 5 October 2020, he was loaned to Fano.

On 31 January 2022, Nepi signed a contract until 30 June 2026 with Pro Vercelli and was loaned to Lecco. On 25 August 2022, Nepi moved on loan to Alessandria. On 3 January 2023, he returned to Pro Vercelli and was loaned out to Renate.

References

External links
 
 

2000 births
Living people
Sportspeople from Ancona
Footballers from Marche
Italian footballers
Association football forwards
Serie C players
Serie D players
Fermana F.C. players
S.S.D. Jesina Calcio players
Alma Juventus Fano 1906 players
F.C. Pro Vercelli 1892 players
Calcio Lecco 1912 players
U.S. Alessandria Calcio 1912 players
A.C. Renate players